The Exoschizonidae are a family in the phylum Apicomplexa.

History

This family was created by Levine in 1971.

Taxonomy

There is one genus currently recognised in this family - Exoschizon. This genus has only one species - Exoschizon siphonosomae - which was described by Hukui in 1939.

Description

This species was found in the intestine of a sipunculid worm (Siphonosoma cumanense) in Japan.

The meronts measure . There are ~13 longitudinal striations per side.

The meronts and gamonts are similarly shaped.

Transmission is presumably by the orofaecal route.

References

Apicomplexa families